Cities and towns under the krai's jurisdiction:
Stavropol (Ставрополь) (administrative center)
city districts:
Leninsky (Ленинский)
Oktyabrsky (Октябрьский)
Promyshlenny (Промышленный)
Budyonnovsk (Будённовск)
Georgiyevsk (Георгиевск)
Kislovodsk (Кисловодск)
with 1 selsovet under the city's jurisdiction.
Lermontov (Лермонтов)
Mineralnye Vody (Минеральные Воды)
Urban-type settlements under the town's jurisdiction:
Andzhiyevsky (Анджиевский)
with 1 selsovet under the town's jurisdiction.
Nevinnomyssk (Невинномысск)
Pyatigorsk (Пятигорск)
Urban-type settlements under the city's jurisdiction:
Goryachevodsky (Горячеводский)
Svobody (Свободы)
with 2 selsovets under the city's jurisdiction.
Yessentuki (Ессентуки)
Zheleznovodsk (Железноводск)
Urban-type settlements under the town's jurisdiction:
Inozemtsevo resort settlement (Иноземцево)
Districts:
Alexandrovsky (Александровский)
with 8 selsovets under the district's jurisdiction.
Andropovsky (Андроповский)
with 11 selsovets under the district's jurisdiction.
Apanasenkovsky (Апанасенковский)
with 11 selsovets under the district's jurisdiction.
Arzgirsky (Арзгирский)
with 8 selsovets under the district's jurisdiction.
Blagodarnensky (Благодарненский)
Towns under the district's jurisdiction:
Blagodarny (Благодарный)
with 13 selsovets under the district's jurisdiction.
Budyonnovsky (Будённовский)
with 13 selsovets under the district's jurisdiction.
Georgiyevsky (Георгиевский)
with 14 selsovets under the district's jurisdiction.
Grachyovsky (Грачёвский)
with 8 selsovets under the district's jurisdiction.
Ipatovsky (Ипатовский)
Towns under the district's jurisdiction:
Ipatovo (Ипатово)
with 15 selsovets under the district's jurisdiction.
Izobilnensky (Изобильненский)
Towns under the district's jurisdiction:
Izobilny (Изобильный)
Urban-type settlements under the district's jurisdiction:
Ryzdvyany (Рыздвяный)
Solnechnodolsk (Солнечнодольск)
with 12 selsovets under the district's jurisdiction.
Kirovsky (Кировский)
Towns under the district's jurisdiction:
Novopavlovsk (Новопавловск)
with 9 selsovets under the district's jurisdiction.
Kochubeyevsky (Кочубеевский)
with 15 selsovets under the district's jurisdiction.
Krasnogvardeysky (Красногвардейский)
with 11 selsovets under the district's jurisdiction.
Kursky (Курский)
with 12 selsovets under the district's jurisdiction.
Levokumsky (Левокумский)
with 11 selsovets under the district's jurisdiction.
Mineralovodsky (Минераловодский)
with 12 selsovets under the district's jurisdiction.
Neftekumsky (Нефтекумский)
Towns under the district's jurisdiction:
Neftekumsk (Нефтекумск)
Urban-type settlements under the district's jurisdiction:
Zaterechny (Затеречный)
with 10 selsovets under the district's jurisdiction.
Novoalexandrovsky (Новоалександровский)
Towns under the district's jurisdiction:
Novoalexandrovsk (Новоалександровск)
with 11 selsovets under the district's jurisdiction.
Novoselitsky (Новоселицкий)
with 8 selsovets under the district's jurisdiction.
Petrovsky (Петровский)
Towns under the district's jurisdiction:
Svetlograd (Светлоград)
with 12 selsovets under the district's jurisdiction.
Predgorny (Предгорный)
with 15 selsovets under the district's jurisdiction.
Shpakovsky (Шпаковский)
Towns under the district's jurisdiction:
Mikhaylovsk (Михайловск)
with 11 selsovets under the district's jurisdiction.
Sovetsky (Советский)
Towns under the district's jurisdiction:
Zelenokumsk (Зеленокумск)
with 6 selsovets under the district's jurisdiction.
Stepnovsky (Степновский)
with 7 selsovets under the district's jurisdiction.
Trunovsky (Труновский)
with 6 selsovets under the district's jurisdiction.
Turkmensky (Туркменский)
with 11 selsovets under the district's jurisdiction.

References

Stavropol Krai
Stavropol Krai